Charles T. Knight was an American sound engineer. He was nominated for an Academy Award in the category Best Sound for the film Butterflies Are Free. He worked on more than 40 films between 1964 and 1994.

Selected filmography
 Butterflies Are Free (1972)

References

External links

Year of birth missing
American audio engineers
Place of birth missing
Possibly living people